The bass guitar, electric bass or simply bass, is the lowest-pitched member of the guitar family. It is a plucked string instrument similar in appearance and construction to an electric or acoustic guitar, but with a longer neck and scale length, and typically four to six strings or courses. Since the mid-1950s, the bass guitar has largely replaced the double bass in popular music.

The four-string bass guitar is usually tuned the same as the double bass, which corresponds to pitches one octave lower than the four lowest-pitched strings of a guitar (typically E, A, D, and G). It is played primarily with the fingers or thumb, or with a pick. To be heard at normal performance volumes, electric bass guitars require external amplification.

Terminology 
According to the New Grove Dictionary of Music and Musicians, an "Electric bass guitar [is] a Guitar, usually with four heavy strings tuned E1'–A1'–D2–G2." It also defines bass as "Bass (iv). A contraction of Double bass or Electric bass guitar." According to some authors the proper term is "electric bass". Common names for the instrument are "bass guitar", "electric bass guitar", and "electric bass" and some authors claim that they are historically accurate. A bass guitar whose neck lacks frets is termed a fretless bass.

Scale 
The scale of the bass is located along the length of the string (from the nut to the bridge) and forms what is known as the fingerboard. The scale can range in length but is traditionally 34-35 inches long while "short scale" bass guitars are usually between 30 and 32 inches.

Pickup 

Bass pickups are generally attached to the body of the guitar and located beneath the strings. They are responsible for converting the vibrations of the strings into analogous electrical signals, which are in turn passed as input to an instrument amplifier.

Strings 

Bass guitar strings are composed of a core and winding. The core is a wire which runs through the center of the string and is generally made of steel, nickel, or an alloy. The winding is an additional wire wrapped around the core. Bass guitar strings vary by the material and cross-sectional shape of the winding, with common variants including roundwound, flatwound, tapewound, and groundwound strings. Roundwound and flatwound strings feature windings with circular and rounded-square cross-sections, respectively, with groundwound strings being a hybrid between the two. Meanwhile, tapewound strings feature a metal core with a non-metallic winding. The choice of winding has considerable impact on the sound of the instrument, with certain winding styles often being preferred for certain musical genres.

History

1930s 

In the 1930s, musician and inventor Paul Tutmarc of Seattle, Washington, developed the first electric bass guitar in its modern form, a fretted instrument designed to be played horizontally. The 1935 sales catalog for Tutmarc's company Audiovox featured his "Model 736 Bass Fiddle", a solid-bodied electric bass guitar with four strings, a  scale length, and a single pickup. Around 100 were made during this period.
Audiovox also sold their "Model 236" bass amplifier.

1950s 

In the 1950s, Leo Fender and George Fullerton developed the first mass-produced electric bass guitar. The Fender Electric Instrument Manufacturing Company began producing the Precision Bass, or P-Bass, in October 1951. The design featured a simple uncontoured "slab" body design and a single coil pickup similar to that of a Telecaster. By 1957 the Precision more closely resembled the Fender Stratocaster with the body edges beveled for comfort, and the pickup was changed to a split coil design.

The Fender Bass was a revolutionary instrument for gigging musicians. In comparison with the large, heavy upright bass, which had been the main bass instrument in popular music from the early 20th century to the 1940s, the bass guitar could be easily transported to shows. When amplified, the bass guitar was also less prone than acoustic basses to unwanted audio feedback. The addition of frets enabled bassists to play in tune more easily than on fretless acoustic or electric upright basses, and allowed guitarists to more easily transition to the instrument.

In 1953, Monk Montgomery became the first bassist to tour with the Fender bass, in Lionel Hampton's postwar big band. Montgomery was also possibly the first to record with the electric bass, on July 2, 1953, with the Art Farmer Septet. Roy Johnson (with Lionel Hampton), and Shifty Henry (with Louis Jordan and His Tympany Five), were other early Fender bass pioneers. Bill Black, who played with Elvis Presley, switched from upright bass to the Fender Precision Bass around 1957. The bass guitar was intended to appeal to guitarists as well as upright bass players, and many early pioneers of the instrument, such as Carol Kaye, Joe Osborn, and Paul McCartney were originally guitarists.

Also in 1953, Gibson released the first short-scale violin-shaped electric bass, the EB-1, with an extendable end pin so a bassist could play it upright or horizontally. In 1958, Gibson released the maple arched-top EB-2 described in the Gibson catalog as a "hollow-body electric bass that features a Bass/Baritone pushbutton for two different tonal characteristics". In 1959, these were followed by the more conventional-looking EB-0 Bass. The EB-0 was very similar to a Gibson SG in appearance (although the earliest examples have a slab-sided body shape closer to that of the double-cutaway Les Paul Special). The Fender and Gibson versions used bolt-on and set necks.

Several other companies also began manufacturing bass guitars during the 1950s. 1956 saw the appearance at the German trade fair "Musikmesse Frankfurt" of the distinctive Höfner 500/1 violin-shaped bass, made using violin construction techniques by Walter Höfner, a second-generation violin luthier. Due to its use by Paul McCartney, it became known as the "Beatle bass". In 1957, Rickenbacker introduced the model 4000, the first bass to feature a neck-through-body design in which the neck is part of the body wood. Kay Musical Instrument Company began production of the K-162 in 1952, Danelectro released the Longhorn in 1956, and Burns London/Supersound in 1958.

1960s 

With the explosion in popularity of rock music in the 1960s, many more manufacturers began making electric basses, including Yamaha, Teisco and Guyatone. Introduced in 1960, the Fender Jazz Bass, initially known as the "Deluxe Bass", used a body design known as an offset waist which was first seen on the Jazzmaster guitar in an effort to improve comfort while playing seated. The Jazz bass, or J-Bass, features two single-coil pickups.

Providing a more "Gibson-scale" instrument, rather than the  Jazz and Precision, Fender produced the Mustang Bass, a  scale-length instrument.  The Fender VI, a 6 string bass, was tuned one octave lower than standard guitar tuning. It was released in 1961, and was briefly favored by Jack Bruce of Cream.

Gibson introduced its short-scale  EB-3 in 1961, also used by Bruce. The EB-3 had a "mini-humbucker" at the bridge position. Gibson basses tended to be instruments with a shorter 30.5" scale length than the Precision. Gibson did not produce a -scale bass until 1963 with the release of the Thunderbird.

The first commercial fretless bass guitar was the Ampeg AUB-1, introduced in 1966. In the late 1960s, eight-string basses, with four octave paired courses (similar to a 12 string guitar), were introduced, such as the Hagström H8.

1970s 
In 1972, Alembic established what became known as "boutique" or "high-end" electric bass guitars. These expensive, custom-tailored instruments, as used by Phil Lesh, Jack Casady, and Stanley Clarke, featured unique designs, premium hand-finished wood bodies, and innovative construction techniques such as multi-laminate neck-through-body construction and graphite necks. Alembic also pioneered the use of onboard electronics for pre-amplification and equalization. Active electronics increase the output of the instrument, and allow more options for controlling tonal flexibility, giving the player the ability to amplify as well as to attenuate certain frequency ranges while improving the overall frequency response (including more low-register and high-register sounds). 1976 saw the UK company Wal begin production of their own range of active basses. In 1974 Music Man Instruments, founded by Tom Walker, Forrest White and Leo Fender, introduced the StingRay, the first widely produced bass with active (powered) electronics built into the instrument. Basses with active electronics can include a preamplifier and knobs for boosting and cutting the low and high frequencies.

In the mid-1970s, five-string basses, with a very low "B" string, were introduced. In 1975, bassist Anthony Jackson commissioned luthier Carl Thompson to build a six-string bass tuned (low to high) B0, E1, A1, D2, G2, C3, adding a low B string and a high C string.

See also 
 Acoustic bass guitar
 Fretless bass
 Bass guitar tuning
 Bass instrument amplification
 Bass effects
 Pickups
 List of bass guitar manufacturers
 List of bass guitarists

References

Bibliography
 
 
 
 
 
 
 
 
 
 
 

American inventions
American musical instruments
Amplified instruments
Bass guitars
Bass (sound)
Blues instruments
Contrabass instruments
Electric bass guitars
Folk music instruments
Guitars
Jazz instruments
Rhythm section
Rock music instruments
String instruments